Waia may refer to:
Waia language of Papua New Guinea
Waia, Sierra Leone, a place in the Koinadugu District of Sierra Leone
Waia, Kenya, a settlement in the Mbooni Constituency of Kenya

WAIA may refer to:
WAIA, a former radio station of Kentucky, United States
WAIA, a former radio station of Florida, United States, whose calls are now used by WFLC

See also
 Waya (disambiguation)